Fullerton is a surname. Notable people with the surname include:

 Alexander Fullerton (born 1924), British author of Naval and Marine novels
 C. Gordon Fullerton (1936–2013), American astronaut and NASA research pilot
 Charlotte Fullerton (born 1949), American author
 Curt Fullerton (1898–1975), American major League baseball player
 David Fullerton (1772–1843), member of the U.S. House of Representatives from Pennsylvania
 Donald B. Fullerton (1892–1985), Christian missionary and Bible teacher
 Ed Fullerton (born 1931), former American footballer
 Eddie Fullerton (1935–1991), Sinn Féin councillor from County Donegal
 Elizabeth Fullerton (born 1953), Australian lawyer, judge of the Supreme Court of New South Wales
 Eric Fullerton (1878–1962), British Royal Navy officer
 Fiona Fullerton (born 1956), English actress
 George Fullerton (cricketer) (1922–2002), South African cricketer
 George Stuart Fullerton (1859–1925), American psychologist and writer
 George William Fullerton (1921–2009), American guitar innovator, (associate of Leo Fender)
 Georgiana Fullerton (1812–1885), English novelist
 Hugh Fullerton (1873–1945), American sportswriter
 Jackie Fullerton (born 1943), Northern Irish television presenter
 James Fullerton (1909–1991), American ice hockey coach and referee
 John Fullerton (1912–1965), Canadian politician
 Keith Fullerton Whitman (born 1973), American electronic musician
 Mary Eliza Fullerton (1868–1946), Australian writer
 Maryellen Fullerton, American lawyer and interim dean and law professor of law at Brooklyn Law School
 Michael Fullerton (born 1971), Scottish artist
 Robert Fullerton (1773–1831), Scottish governor of Penang, Malaysia
 Spencer Fullerton Baird (1823–1887), American ornithologist
 Terry Fullerton, (born 1953), British racing driver
 Ticky Fullerton (born 1963), Australian business journalist
 Tracy Fullerton (born 1965), American game designer
 Travis Fullerton, American musician
 William Young Fullerton (1857–1932), Irish Baptist preacher

See also